Christopher Gane (born 5 June 1974) is an English professional golfer.

Gane has mainly competed on the second tier Challenge Tour and has two wins on that tour, both in 2001. In 2009 he finished 13th in the Challenge Tour rankings to guarantee himself full European Tour status for 2010. He is one of the few left-handed players on tour.

Professional wins (4)

Challenge Tour wins (2)

PGA EuroPro Tour wins (2)

See also
2009 Challenge Tour graduates
2011 Challenge Tour graduates

References

External links

English male golfers
European Tour golfers
Left-handed golfers
Golfers from London
1974 births
Living people